The Karsten-Ping Open was a golf tournament on the LPGA Tour from 1975 to 1976. It was played at the Camelback Country Club in Paradise Valley, Arizona in 1975 and at the McCormick Ranch Golf Club in Scottsdale, Arizona in 1976.

Winners
 1976 Judy Rankin
 1975 Jane Blalock

References

Former LPGA Tour events
Golf in Arizona
Sports in Phoenix, Arizona
Sports in Scottsdale, Arizona
Women's sports in Arizona
Sports competitions in Maricopa County, Arizona